Mockingbird is a 2014 American found footage horror film written and directed by Bryan Bertino, from a story by Bertino and Sam Esmail. The film was released to video on demand on October 7, 2014 and was given a DVD and Blu-ray release on October 21 of the same year. It stars Todd Stashwick, Alexandra Lydon, and Barak Hardley as three people that have been given video cameras with the instructions to film their daily activities for a strange contest.

Plot

The film follows three groups of people, all of whom have found a video camera on their doorstep and begin filming under the impression that this is the key to winning money from a mysterious competition. Tom (Todd Stashwick) is an average guy filming the life of his family with his wife Emmy. Beth (Alexandra Lydon) is a bored and isolated college girl who sees the camera as something to fill her free time. Leonard (Barak Hardley) is a mother's boy who believes his clown makeup will steal the scene. Each group has been given a label - "The Family" (Tom & Emmy), "The Woman" (Beth), and "The Clown" (Leonard), but they are largely unaware of what is truly going on and are shocked when they receive instructions telling them to keep filming or die.

Cast
Audrey Marie Anderson as Emmy
Natalie Alyn Lind as Jacob's Friend #4
Benjamin Stockham as Jacob's Friend #2
Emily Alyn Lind as Abby
Alyvia Alyn Lind as Megan
Todd Stashwick as Tom
Lee Garlington as Mom
Spencer List as Jacob Henry
Isabella Murad as Jacob's Friend #3
Alexandra Lydon as Beth
Barak Hardley as Leonard

Reception
Bloody Disgusting and Indiewire both gave favorable reviews for Mockingbird, and Bloody Disgusting praised the film for its tone and wrote that while it "lacks some of the studio polish of The Strangers, it actually feels bigger than that film in some regards." HorrorNews.net and We Got This Covered both panned the film, and We Got This Covered commented that "Mockingbird plays like an over-bloated V/H/S anthology segment that wastes a jolting start on generic, recycled "found footage" tropes seen a billion times before."

References

External links

2014 horror films
Found footage films
American horror thriller films
Blumhouse Productions films
Films produced by Jason Blum
Horror films about clowns
2010s English-language films
2010s American films